Senad Merdanović (born 7 August 1961 in Kakanj, SFR Yugoslavia) is a retired Bosnian professional footballer. He was a member of the FK Sarajevo squad that won the Yugoslav First League in 1985. In August 2006 he was named the Director of football of FK Sarajevo, a position he held until 2010.

Personal life
His brother Nijaz Merdanović was also a notable member of FK Sarajevo, and later club chairman.

References

1961 births
Living people
People from Kakanj
Association football midfielders
Yugoslav footballers
FK Sarajevo players
Kickers Offenbach players
Yugoslav First League players
Yugoslav expatriate footballers
Expatriate footballers in Germany
Bosnia and Herzegovina expatriate sportspeople in Germany